Abderrahman Ibrir (10 November 1919 – 18 February 1988) was an Algerian football player and manager.

Playing career
Born in Dellys, Ibrir played club football in France for Bordeaux, Toulouse and Marseille. He also earned six caps for France national team the between 1949 and 1950, and later played for the FLN team between 1959 and 1960.

Coaching career
Ibrir managed the Algeria national team. He was also Algerian champion with MC Alger in 1979.

Later life and death
He died by drowning, off the coast of Sidi Fredj, in 1988.

References

1919 births
1988 deaths
People from Dellys
Algerian footballers
French footballers
France international footballers
FC Girondins de Bordeaux players
Toulouse FC players
Olympique de Marseille players
Ligue 1 players
Association football goalkeepers
Algerian football managers
Algeria national football team managers
MC Alger managers
FLN football team players
Deaths by drowning
Accidental deaths in Algeria